The 2002–03 Vyshcha Liha season was the 12th since its establishment. FC Shakhtar Donetsk were the defending champions.

Teams

Promotions
Volyn-1 Lutsk, the winners of the 2001–02 Ukrainian First League  – (returning after absence of 6 seasons)
Chornomorets Odesa, the runners-up of the 2001–02 Ukrainian First League  – (returning after absence of 2 seasons)
Obolon Kyiv, the third placed of the 2001–02 Ukrainian First League  – (debut)

Renamed
 On 22 July 2002 SC Volyn-1 Lutsk changed its name to FC Volyn Lutsk.
 17 December 2002 FC Metalurh Mariupol changed its name to FC Illichivets Mariupol.
 25 February 2003 FC Polihraftekhnika Oleksandriya changed its name to FC Oleksandriya.

Location

League table

Results

Top goal scorers

References

External links
ukrsoccerhistory.com - source of information

Ukrainian Premier League seasons
1
Ukra